Abu Bakr Ahmad bin `Amr ad-Dahhak bin Makhlad ash-Shaibani, widely known as Ibn Abi Asim, was an Iraqi Sunni  scholar of the 9th century.  He is most famous for his work in the field of hadith science.

Biography

Family and early life
Ibn Abi Asim was born in Basra, Iraq in 822. He grew up in an academic household, as both his father and his grandfather were scholars of Prophetic traditions in their own right. Due to his family's scholarly background, he was educated in the religious sciences at an early age. While religious learning was often begun in a madrasa or masjid starting in the early teens, Ibn Abi Asim had a head start relative to his time period.

Career
Eventually, Ibn Abi Asim left Basra for the city of Isfahan, further to the east. Late in life, he was granted a position as a judge at his new city of residence.

Death
Ibn Abi Asim died in Isfahan in the year 900. He was 81 years old and at the time of his death, he was still holding his position as a judge. According to  Iranian historian Abu Nu`aym, Ibn Abi Asim was buried in Isfahan's Doshabaz cemetery.

Legacy

Works
Ibn Abi Asim compiled numerous Prophetic traditions into two volumes, organized into chapters based on different theological and creed-related topics. He had also written about the first-generation Muslim and Umayyad caliph, Mu'awiyah, though the work is now lost. Likewise, the exact topic has eluded historians, with Al-Suyuti claiming it was a book on Mu'awiyah's dreams, while Ibn Hajar referred to it as a book on Mu'awiyah's virtues. It is not known whether the topic Ibn Abi Asim's essay was actually disputed, or if he had simply written about both topics.

Sunni Muslim evaluation
Historians Abu al-Abbas al-Niswi and Abu Nu`aym both  reported Ibn Abi Asim as having been a Zahirite. Although he has become an important figure for the Zahiri school in the modern day, few of his works in jurisprudence have survived to the modern era.

References

Iraqi Sunni Muslim scholars of Islam
9th-century Muslim scholars of Islam
Hadith compilers
820s births
900 deaths
Zahiris
Year of birth uncertain
9th-century jurists
9th-century Arabs